Kuala Terengganu Rovers Football Club, or popularly known as KT Rovers is a Malaysian amateur football club based in Kuala Terengganu, Terengganu. They currently play in the third-tier division in Malaysian football, the Malaysia M3 League. The club is also involved in the Malaysia FA Cup.

History
The club founded in 1984 in Kuala Terengganu, Terengganu and participated in several competitions in Kuala Terengganu. However, not many records are kept or known.

In 2018, the club has won the Terengganu Amateur League and been eligible to compete in the Malaysia M3 League.

On 17 February 2019, the club competed in the Malaysia FA Cup for the first time in the club's history.

Starting from 2020 season, the team has been rebranded to Kuala Terengganu Rovers Football Club as an effort to bring in local area support.

Players

First-team squad

Management team

Club personnel
 Manager: Kamril Isam Mohd
 Assistant Manager: Mohd Ridhuan Embong
 Head coach: Mohd Azhari Salim
 Assistant coach : Mohd Nazeri Mat Ali
 Goalkeeping coach: Shaik Anuar Shaik Abdul Ghani
 Fitness coach: 
 Physio :

Season by season record
Updated on 8 June 2020.

Notes:   2020 Season cancelled due to the 2020 Coronavirus Pandemic, no promotion or league title was awarded although this is now subject to a possible legal challenge

 Honours 

 Domestic competitions 
 Cups TAL Cup  Winner (1) : ' 2018

References

External links
 Facebook Official
 Official Twitter Page

Malaysia M3 League
Football clubs in Malaysia